Samarina is a village and a former municipality in Grevena regional unit, West Macedonia, Greece. Since the 2011 local government reform it is part of the municipality Grevena, of which it is a municipal unit.  Its population primarily consists of Aromanians (sometimes called Vlachs). It attracts many tourists due to its scenic location and beautiful pine and beech forests. The population was 378 people as of 2011. The municipal unit has an area of 97.245 km2 (37½ sq. mi.).

Samarina is the most famous of all the Aromanian (Vlach) villages of the Pindus and the inhabitants are fiercely proud of their heritage and traditions.  Every summer on August 15, on the feast of the Dormition of the Virgin, Samarinans from all over the world assemble on their ancestral village to celebrate.  There, on the main square outside the Great Church, they perform the "Great Dance" (Greek: Tranós Chorós, Aromanian: Corlu Mari): thousands of people hold hands and form concentric circles, and they walk slowly and ceremonially counterclockwise, while singing their traditional songs in a rousing unison chorus.

Location
Samarina is located on an eastern spur of Mount Smolikas, the highest of the Pindus range and the second-highest mountain in all of Greece. At an altitude of 1380–1515 meters (4528' to 4970'), it is considered one of the highest villages in Greece and also one of the highest in the Balkans; its height puts it among soaring settlements such as: Aetomilitsa
(Densko) and Seli
(Selia).

Climate
Samarina has a warm-summer humid continental climate (Köppen climate classification: Dfb) using the 0 °C (32 °F) isotherm, or a temperate oceanic climate (Köppen climate classification: Cfb) using the -3 °C (27 °F) isotherm for the coldest month. Samarina experiences cold winters with high precipitation and warm, drier summers.

History
This village in the Pindos mountains with its Aromanian population enjoyed successful periods of exceptional economic growth and cultural development. On a map it was shown under the name Santa Marina. Its inhabitants tended sheep and goats and wove a woolen fabric called flokati ('nflucati, velentza), which they sold at the region's trade fairs. The people of Samarina were also involved in trade, and as muleteers they pioneered long caravans that traveled all over the Balkans. The level of culture reached by this town (it had churches, schools and a library) is evident in the excellence of its religious painting. Samarina flourished at the end of the 18th century and during the 19th. The economic success was based on a group of activities, but mostly in the cattle-breeding, the small industries, the trade and the arts.

An important account of the life of the Aromanian population of Samarina at the beginning of the 20th century is provided in a study by A.J.B. Wace and M.S. Thompson entitled Nomads of the Balkans: an account of life and customs among the Vlachs of Northern Pindus, London 1914.

The Greek folklore song "Children of Samarina" (Greek: Παιδιά απ'την Σαμαρίνα) is associated with it. It refers to local volunteers who fought and lost their lives during the Greek War of Independence against the Turks in 1821. In particular, it refers to the Messolonghi events and the heroic "Exodus of its Guards".

Samarina was the birthplace of Alcibiades Diamandi and Nicolaos Matussis, leaders of the Roman Legion, who promoted a local autonomous Aromanian nationalist canton during World War II called in some cases the Principality of Pindus (this name is mainly used for the events of 1917 in Samarina). It was also where the revolutionary Ioannis Arkoudas came from.

Notes

Populated places in Grevena (regional unit)
Former municipalities in Western Macedonia
Aromanian settlements in Greece